The West African Dwarf is a large and variable breed or group of breeds of domestic goat from coastal West and Central Africa, a range extending approximately from Senegal to Congo. It is characterised by achondroplasia or dwarfism, a trait that may have evolved in response to conditions in the humid forests of the area, and also by some degree of resistance to tsetse-borne trypanosomiasis or "sleeping-sickness". 

There are many regional strains or breeds within the group; other names for the group as a whole include African Dwarf, Djallonké or Fouta Jallon, Grassland Dwarf or Chèvre Naine des Savanes, Guinean or Guinean Dwarf,  Forest Goat and Pygmy.

History 

The West African Dwarf is a traditional breed of West and Central Africa. Its dwarf characteristics may have evolved as a response to conditions in the humid forests of the area.

The goats have at various times been exported to European countries and to the United States, initially as zoo animals or for laboratory research. Several breeds derive from these imports, among them the American Pygmy and Nigerian Dwarf in the United States, the Pygmy in the United Kingdom, the Dutch Dwarf or Nederlandse Dwerggeit in the Netherlands, and the Tibetana in Italy.

Characteristics 

Adult males weigh  and females . Both sexes have horns, which curve outwards and backwards in males. Males also have beards and sometimes manes. Characteristics include a relatively long neck, broad chest, and straight back. Legs are short and the udder is small but generally well-shaped. Most have short stiff hair, and colour varies; dark brown with black points is probably the most common, but black, red, white, pied, and multi-coloured goats also occur.

There are numerous regional breeds or strains within the overall West African Dwarf grouping. These include the Cameroon Dwarf in Cameroon, the Casamance in Senegal, the Côte d'Ivoire Dwarf in Côte d'Ivoire, the Djougry or Chèvre Nain de l'Est in Mauritania, the Ghan Forest in Ghana, the Kirdi in the north of Cameroon and in the south of Chad, the Kosi in Cameroon and the Nigerian Dwarf in Nigeria. In Burkina Faso and Togo, the Fouta Djallon or Djallonké sub-group includes traditional strains including the Bath, the Kanem, the Kebbi, the Lac, the Massakori, the Mayo and the Mossi.

Use 

West African Dwarf goats are important in the rural village economy of West Africa. Nigerian West African Dwarf goats are trypanotolerant (they resist to infections by Trypanosoma) and haemonchotolerant (they resist infections with the gastrointestinal parasite nematode Haemonchus contortus more effectively than other breeds of domestic goat).

West African Dwarf goats are capable of breeding at twelve to eighteen months. Multiple births are very common, with twins being normal and triplets frequent. The kidding interval averages about 220 days. These goats are typically kept as livestock by families who harvest or sell the milk and meat.

See also

Djallonké (disambiguation)

References

Goat breeds
Meat goat breeds
Agriculture in Africa
Agriculture in Sierra Leone